{{Infobox settlement
| official_name            = Quilicura
| settlement_type          = City and Commune
| image_skyline            = 
| image_alt                = 
| image_caption            = 
| image_flag               = Bandera de Quilicura.svg
| flag_alt                 = Flag
| image_shield             = Escudo de Quilicura.svg
| shield_alt               = Coat of arms
| image_map                = Comuna de Quilicura.svg
| map_alt                  = Map of Quilicura commune in Greater Santiago
| map_caption              = Map of Quilicura commune in Greater Santiago
| pushpin_map              = Chile
| pushpin_map_narrow       = yes
| pushpin_label_position   = bottom
| pushpin_map_alt          = Location in Chile
| pushpin_map_caption      = Location in Chile
| coordinates              = 
| coor_pinpoint            = city
| coordinates_footnotes    = 
| subdivision_type         = Country
| subdivision_name         = Chile
| subdivision_type1        = Region
| subdivision_name1        = Santiago
| subdivision_type2        = Province
| subdivision_name2        = Santiago
| government_footnotes     = 
| government_type          = Municipality
| leader_title             = Alcalde
| leader_party             = Ind.
| leader_name              = Paulina Bobadilla Navarrete
| established_date         = 1902
| unit_pref                = Metric
| area_footnotes           = 
| area_total_km2           = 57.5
| elevation_footnotes      = 
| elevation_m              = 
| population_footnotes     = 
| population_total         = 210,410
| population_as_of         = 2017 census
| population_density_km2   = auto
| population_demonym       = 
| population_blank1_title  = Urban
| population_blank2_title  = Rural
| demographics_type1       = Sex (2017 census)
| demographics1_footnotes  = 
| demographics1_title1     = Men
| demographics1_info1      = 103,456
| demographics1_title2     = Women
| demographics1_info2      = 106,954
| postal_code_type         = 
| postal_code              = 
| area_code                = 
| footnotes                = 
| website                  = Municipality of Quilicura
}}Quilicura' is a commune of Chile located in capital Santiago. Founded in 1901, it was originally a satellite city on what were then the outskirts of the city of Santiago, but as urban sprawl has set in it is now quickly urbanizing from what was recently prime agricultural land.

Etymology
The origin of the name Quilicura is from the Mapuche language Mapudungun and comes from the words kila meaning three and kura'' meaning stone. The "Three Stones" are three hills which separate the area and formed the border with Renca.

Location

Quilicura is located in Santiago Province, Santiago Metropolitan Region, at the northwestern edge of Chile's capital Santiago. It borders Renca to the south (naturally separated by Renca Hill), Pudahuel to the west, Huechuraba and Conchalí to the east, and Lampa and Colina to the north.

There is little green space in comparison to wealthier neighborhoods in the city because Quilicura is still an industrial area.

Demographics

Of these, 125,999 (99.6%) lived in urban areas and 519 (0.4%) in rural areas. The population grew by 207.7% (85,397 persons) between the 1992 and 2002 censuses. According to the 2012 census preliminary data Quilicura is now home to 203,946 residents.

In 2005 the regional quality of life index was rated at a medium level of 72.53 or 34 out of 52. In 2003 Quilicura's Human Development Index was recorded as 0.782 or 19 out of 341.

In 2011 the average annual household per capita income was rated at US$39,302 (PPP).

For the year 2017; according to the results of the 2017 census delivered by the National Institute of Statistics, the population of the commune increased to a total of 210 410 inhabitants, of which 103 456 (49%) correspond to men, while 106 954 (51%) correspond to women; therefore, its masculinity index is 96,7.

In recent years, Quilicura has become the home of a large Haitian community.

Transport

Quilicura is located about 12 km from Santiago's international airport and is served by the Américo Vespucio Norte Highway as well as the Pan-American Highway. RED public buses connect Quilicura to the centre of Santiago and run frequently in each direction. The first phase of the Santiago Metro Line 3 connecting the commune with the rest of the network was completed on 22 January 2019, with phase 2 being completed in 2023. Currently, the closest metro station to Quilicura is Los Libertadores which is the northern terminus of the line 3.

Administration
As a commune, Quilicura is a third-level administrative division of Chile administered by a municipal council, headed by a mayor who is directly-elected every four years. The 2021-2024 mayor is Paulina Bobadilla Navarrete (Ind./Comunes). The communal council has the following members:
 Alexandra Arancibia Olea (Ind./PEV)
 Nicolas Quiroz Venegas (Ind./PEV)
 Gonzalo López Pizarro (Ind./PH)
 Daniela Cuevas Fuentes (PCCh)
 Lorena Ayala Galaz (Ind./RD)
 Juan Muñoz Milla (Ind./PPD)
 María Margarita Indo Romo (PDC)
 Miguel Astudillo Cáceres (RN)

Within the electoral divisions of Chile, Quilicura is part of electoral district No. 8 together with the commune of Colina, Lampa, Pudahuel, Maipú, Til Til, Cerrillos and Estación Central. On the other hand, the commune belongs to the VII Senatorial District that represents the entire Metropolitan Region of Santiago.

Notable people
 

 Carmen Romo Sepúlveda

References

External links
  Municipality de Quilicura
  Quilicura TV Canal 6 Comunitario
 In Mapudungun

Populated places in Santiago Province, Chile
Geography of Santiago, Chile
Communes of Chile
Populated places established in 1901
1901 establishments in Chile